Merricks railway station was located on the Red Hill railway line.
The line was opened in 1921 and was one of the more short lived branch lines on the Victorian Railways closing in 1952 with many other smaller branch lines in the railways system. The Merricks station grounds are now part of an equestrian facility. Part of the railway alignment between Red Hill and Merricks stations has also been converted into an equestrian and walking trail with the remaining majority of the line now located on private properties.

References

Disused railway stations in Melbourne
Railway stations in Australia opened in 1921
Railway stations closed in 1952